Written and illustrated by Hiro Mashima, the chapters of the manga series Rave Master premiered in Japan in Weekly Shōnen Magazine in 1999 where it ran until its conclusion in 2005. They follow Haru Glory's quest to complete the Ten Commandments Sword which is able to destroy evil powerful stones known as the Dark Bring that are being used by several people around the world.

The 296 chapters individual chapters were collected and published in thirty-five tankōbon volumes by Kodansha, with the first volume released on November 17, 1999 and the final volume released on September 9, 2005. Rave Master was licensed for an English release in North America by Tokyopop, which released 32 volumes of the series. On August 31, 2009, Tokyopop announced that they would not be completing the series as their licenses with Kodansha expired and Kodansha required that they immediately stop publication of all previously licensed series, including Rave Master. Because of this, the series was considered to be out-of-print. The next month, it was announced that Del Rey Manga had acquired the license and would begin publishing the remaining volumes in November 2010. The last three volumes were published in a single omnibus volume. Del Rey has not re-released earlier volumes. The series is licensed for regional language releases in French by Glenat, in Spanish by Norma Editorial, and in Italian by Editions Star Comics. Egmont Manga & Anime licensed Rave Master for a German release, including serializing it in their monthly anthology . Rave Master was one of the first manga series released in Spanish in North America by Public Square Books.

The first twelve volumes of the manga series were adapted into a fifty-one episode anime series by Studio Deen. The anime series, which premiered on TBS on October 13, 2001 and ran until September 28, 2002, is also licensed by Tokyopop for release and broadcast in North America.

On October 3, 2017, all 35 volumes have been re-released in North America digitally by Kodansha USA.



Volume list

Volumes 1–18

Volumes 19–35

References

External links
 Official Shonen Magazine Rave Master manga website 
 Official Tokyopop Rave Master manga website
Official Kodansha USA Rave Master manga website
 

Chapters
Rave Master